Naomi Milgrom  (born ) is an Australian businesswoman and philanthropist. Her private company ARJ Group Holdings owns women's clothing retailers Sportsgirl, Sussan and Suzanne Grae.

Life and business career
Milgrom was born in Melbourne, one of four children born to art collectors and retailing magnates Marc and Eva Besen. Her maternal grandmother Faye Gandel, "a Polish seamstress who spoke only broken English", opened a small lingerie store in 1939. Her father, a Jewish refugee from Romania, arrived in Australia in 1947 at the age of 23. She is the niece of billionaire property developer John Gandel.

Milgrom grew up in the Melbourne suburb of St Kilda. She attended Mount Scopus Memorial College and Firbank Girls' Grammar School. She later studied languages at Monash University and also attended the University of New South Wales. She worked for four years as a special education teacher in Sydney, helping autistic and schizophrenic children with language problems. She then worked in publishing and advertising.

In 1977 Milgrom and her first husband Alfred Milgrom established Melbourne House (Publishers) Ltd, a publishing company with offices in Melbourne and London. They published a series of books on computers and in 1980 co-founded video game studio BEAM Software (later Krome Studios Melbourne).

Milgrom joined the family business Sussan in 1988 as marketing and strategic planning manager, after her father bought out his brother-in-law John Gandel. She was appointed merchandise director the following year and in 1990 became chief executive. Milgrom spearheaded the acquisition of Sportsgirl in 1999. In 2003 Milgrom bought her parents and three siblings out of the business and assumed full ownership of all three brands.

Personal life 
Milgrom is married to art collector and philanthropist John Kaldor. She has three children from her first marriage to Alfred Milgrom.  she lived in the Melbourne suburb of Middle Park while her husband lived in Sydney. In 2016 she bought an apartment block on Bondi Beach.  she owned three properties in Byron Bay.

Net worth 

In 2018, Milgrom was the eighth-richest woman in Australia, with an estimated net worth of over 500 million. Milgrom's net worth was reported as follows:

The net worth of Marc Besen and family was assessed separately and, in 2014, was estimated to be 2.29 billion.

Philanthropy 
Milgrom is an active benefactor and participant in arts projects and events. In 2014 she established the Naomi Milgrom Foundation to fund public art, design and architecture projects. The same year, the foundation provided the funding for a series of outdoor pavilions (known as MPavilions) to be built in Queen Victoria Gardens, Melbourne, each spring for four years. International architects are invited to design and build a pavilion; in 2014 Sean Godsell designed the pavilion; in 2015, Amanda Levete; in 2016 Mumbai's Bijoy Jain; and in 2017 the Dutch architect Rem Koolhaas.

Milgrom's other philanthropic projects cover entrepreneurship, contemporary art, music, dance, fashion, culture, science, education, women's health and the Jewish community. She has been Chair of the Australian Centre for Contemporary Art, Chair of the Melbourne Fashion Festival, Director of the Magellan Financial Group and a board member of the Florey Institute of Neuroscience and Mental Health. She has also held the position of board member of the Melbourne Business School and served as Commissioner for the Australian representation at the 57th International Art Exhibition, Venice Biennale 2017. Milgrom is a member of the Art Basel Global Patrons Council, Tate Museum London's International Council and has been a judge for the World Architecture Awards.

Awards 
In 2001 Milgrom was awarded the Centenary Medal for outstanding service to the Melbourne Fashion Festival and the fashion industry.  In 2010, Milgrom was appointed an Officer of the Order of Australia (AO) for service to business as a leader and mentor in the fashion industry, and to the community through advisory and management roles of a wide range of arts, health and philanthropic bodies; and in 2020, Milgrom was appointed a Companion of the Order of Australia (AC) for eminent service to the community through philanthropic leadership and support for the promotion of the arts, architecture, design excellence and cultural exchange, and to business.

In 2015 she was awarded the Australian Institute of Architects President's Prize for her establishment of the MPavilion project in Melbourne.

Milgrom has also received an Honorary Doctorate of Business from RMIT University in 2010, a Distinguished Alumni Lifetime Achievement Award from Monash University in 2010, Creative Partnerships Australia Philanthropy Leadership Award in 2016 and an Honorary Doctorate of Business from the University of New South Wales in 2016.

References

Australian women in business
Living people
Year of birth missing (living people)
Companions of the Order of Australia
Officers of the Order of Australia
Monash University alumni
University of New South Wales alumni
Businesspeople from Melbourne
Australian businesspeople in retailing
Australian people of Romanian-Jewish descent
Australian people of Polish-Jewish descent
Australian philanthropists
Recipients of the Centenary Medal
People from St Kilda, Victoria
People educated at Firbank Girls' Grammar School
Philanthropists from Melbourne